The 65th Assembly District of Wisconsin is one of 99 districts in the Wisconsin State Assembly.  Located in Southeastern Wisconsin, the district covers most of the city of Kenosha, Wisconsin, including downtown Kenosha and Kenosha Harbor and landmarks such as Civic Center Historic District and Library Park. The district is represented by Democrat Tod Ohnstad, since January 2013.

The 65th Assembly District is located within Wisconsin's 22nd Senate district, along with the 64th and 66th Assembly districts.

List of past representatives

References 

Wisconsin State Assembly districts
Kenosha County, Wisconsin